National Highway 13 (NH 13), part of the larger Trans-Arunachal Highway network, is a 1,559 km long two-lane national highway across Arunachal Pradesh in India running from Tawang in northwest to Wakro in southeast. Entire route became operational in 2018 when 6.2 km long Dibang River Bridge was completed across Dibang River. Sela Tunnel, a shorter alternative route with target completion by Jan/Feb 2022, will provide all-weather connectivity. Before the renumbering of highways, it was known as NH 229 and NH52. This strategically important highway enhances Indian military's capabilities in combating the threat of China's Western Theater Command opposite India's eastern sector of Line of Actual Control.

Route
NH13 links Tawang, Bomdila, Nechipu, Seppa, Sagalie, Ziro, Daporijo, Along, Pasighat, Tezu and terminates at its junction with NH-15 near Wakro in the state of Arunachal Pradesh.

Junctions  

  near Joram
  near Hoj
  near Pasighat
  near Pasighat
  near Meka
  near Meka
  near Hawacamp
  Terminal near Wakro.

See also
 Arunachal Frontier Highway, proposed along Indo-China border across upper Arunachal Pradesh
 Arunachal East-West Corridor, proposed across foothills of lower upper Arunachal Pradesh
 List of National Highways in India (by Highway Number)
 List of National Highways in India
 National Highways Development Project

References

External links
 NH 13 on OpenStreetMap, retrieved 19 September 2021.

National highways in India
National Highways in Arunachal Pradesh